Horst Friedrich (born 12 October 1950) was a German politician of the Free Democratic Party (FDP) and former member of the German Bundestag.

Life 
Horst Friedrich was a member of the German Bundestag from 1990 to 2009. Horst Friedrich always entered the Bundestag via the Landesliste Bayern. His constituency was Bayreuth.

Literature

References

1950 births
Members of the Bundestag for Bavaria
Members of the Bundestag 2005–2009
Members of the Bundestag 2002–2005
Members of the Bundestag 1998–2002
Members of the Bundestag 1994–1998
Members of the Bundestag 1990–1994
Members of the Bundestag for the Free Democratic Party (Germany)
Date of death missing